Municipal election for Jitpursimara took place on 13 May 2022, with all 122 positions up for election across 24 wards. The electorate elected a mayor, a deputy mayor, 24 ward chairs and 96 ward members. An indirect election will also be held to elect five female members and an additional three female members from the Dalit and minority community to the municipal executive.

Rajan Paudel of the CPN (Maoist Centre) was elected as the mayor of sub-metropolitan city.

Background 

The first municipal election for the council was held in 2017 after the council was created by incorporating neighboring village development committees into the former Gadhimai municipality by the Local Reconstruction Body Commission. Electors in each ward elect a ward chair and four ward members, out of which two must be female and one of the two must belong to the Dalit community.

In the previous election, Krishna Prasad Paudel from the CPN (Unified Marxist–Leninist) was elected as the first mayor of the sub-metropolitan city.

Candidates 
Krishna Prasad Paudel did not seek re-election and the incumbent deputy mayor, Saraswati Devi Chaudhary, instead served as the candidate for CPN (Unified Marxist–Leninist).

In accordance with the decision of central leaders of Nepali Congress, CPN (Maoist Centre), People's Socialist Party, CPN (Unified Socialist) and Rastriya Janamorcha, an alliance was created to contest local elections in some local units. In Jitpursimara, CPN (Maoist Centre) fielded the candidate for mayor and Nepali Congress fielded the candidate for the deputy mayor from the five-party alliance.

Results

Mayoral election

Ward results 

|-
! colspan="2" style="text-align:centre;" | Party
! Chairman
! Members
|-
| style="background-color:;" |
| style="text-align:left;" |CPN (Unified Marxist-Leninist)
| style="text-align:center;" | 13
| style="text-align:center;" | 55
|-
| style="background-color:;" |
| style="text-align:left;" |Nepali Congress
| style="text-align:center;" | 5
| style="text-align:center;" | 19
|-
| bgcolor=""  |
| style="text-align:left;" |CPN (Maoist Centre)
| style="text-align:center;" | 4
| style="text-align:center;" | 14
|-
| bgcolor=""  |
| style="text-align:left;" |Loktantrik Samajwadi Party, Nepal
| style="text-align:center;" | 1
| style="text-align:center;" | 5
|-
| bgcolor=""  |
| style="text-align:left;" |CPN (Unified Socialist)
| style="text-align:center;" | 1
| style="text-align:center;" | 3
|-
! colspan="2" style="text-align:right;" | Total
! 24
! 96
|}

Summary of results by ward

See also 

 2022 Nepalese local elections
 2022 Provincial Assembly of Madhesh Province election

References

Jitpursimara